Rhiwderin railway station served the Welsh village of Rhiwderin near Newport, Wales.

History and description
The station had two platforms with a large stone building on one side and a wooden shelter on the other. The station had no footbridge, and passengers crossed via a level crossing. The station had a signal box, which is now preserved.

Rhiwderin, like the other stations on this section of the line, was relatively successful in its early years, but as the road networks expanded after the 1940s, its profitability declined. The station proved an early casualty of the blow dealt to the local passenger stations in South Wales by bus services, closing to passengers in 1954 and to freight in 1959.

After closure
As of 2017, the line is still in a functional condition, and sees occasional traffic from Machen Quarry, but there is no longer a passenger station in the area. Rhiwderin station is now a private residence, though much of its original character has been retained. The station signal box was acquired in 1967 by the Caerphilly Railway Society. It is now preserved on the Teifi Valley Railway.

References

Disused railway stations in Caerphilly County Borough
Former Brecon and Merthyr Tydfil Junction Railway stations
Railway stations in Great Britain opened in 1865
Railway stations in Great Britain closed in 1954
1865 establishments in Wales
1959 disestablishments in Wales